Gunay may refer to:
 Gunay, Iran, a village in Iran
 Günay, a Turkish name (including a list of people with the name)
 Günay, Sivrice, a village in Turkey